NB Ridaz.com is the third studio album by NB Ridaz. It was released on April 6, 2004.

Track listing
 "Intro"
 "U Got Me Hot"
 "Cho. n.Low #1"
 "Pretty Girl"
 "So Fly"
 "Tu Eres"
 "Cho. n.Low #2"
 "Wishin" (Produced by The Orphanz)
 "Playaz"
 "4-Ever"
 "Notice Me"
 "Until I Die"
 "Sunshine"
 "Lil Ridaz"
 "Bouce If U Wanna"
 "Cho. n.Low #3"
 "Southwest Ridaz"
 "Magic's Custom CD's"
 "Guess Who's Back"
 "Cho. n.Low #4"

References

2004 albums
NB Ridaz albums